In political and sociological theory, the elite (from , to select or to sort out) are a small group of powerful people who hold a disproportionate amount of wealth, privilege, political power, or skill in a group. Defined by the Cambridge Dictionary, the "elite" are "those people or organizations that are considered the best or most powerful compared to others of a similar type."

American sociologist C. Wright Mills states that members of the elite accept their fellows' position of importance in society. "As a rule, 'they accept one another, understand one another, marry one another, tend to work, and to think, if not together at least alike'." It is a well-regulated existence where education plays a critical role.

Universities in the US
Youthful upper-class members attend prominent preparatory schools, which not only open doors to such elite universities as Harvard, Yale, Princeton, and the University of Pennsylvania, but also to the universities' highly exclusive clubs. These memberships in turn pave the way to the prominent social clubs located in all major cities and serve as sites for important business contacts.

Elitist privilege
According to Mills, men receive the education necessary for elitist privilege to obtain their background and contacts, allowing them to enter three branches of the power elite, which are;
The Political Leadership: Mills contended that since the end of World War II, corporate leaders had become more prominent in the political process, with a decline in central decision-making for professional politicians.
The Military Circle: In Mills' time a heightened concern about warfare existed, making top military leaders and such issues as defense funding and personnel recruitment very important. Most prominent corporate leaders and politicians were strong proponents of military spending.
The Corporate Elite: According to Mills, in the 1950s when the military emphasis was pronounced, it was corporate leaders working with prominent military officers who dominated the development of policies. These two groups tended to be mutually supportive.

According to Mills, the governing elite in the United States primarily draws its members from political leaders, including the president, and a handful of key cabinet members, as well as close advisers, major corporate owners and directors, and high-ranking military officers. These groups overlap and elites tend to circulate from one sector to another, consolidating power in the process.

Unlike the ruling class, a social formation based on heritage and social ties, the power elite is characterized by the organizational structures through which its wealth is acquired. According to Mills, the power elite rose from "the managerial reorganization of the propertied classes into the more or less unified stratum of the corporate rich". Domhoff further clarified the differences in the two terms: "The upper class as a whole does not do the ruling. Instead, class rule is manifested through the activities of a wide variety of organizations and institutions...Leaders within the upper class join with high-level employees in the organizations they control to make up what will be called the power elite".

The Marxist theoretician Nikolai Bukharin anticipated the elite theory in his 1929 work, Imperialism and World Economy: "present-day state power is nothing but an entrepreneurs' company of tremendous power, headed even by the same persons that occupy the leading positions in the banking and syndicate offices".

Power elite 
The power elite is a term used by Mills to describe a relatively small, loosely connected group of individuals who dominate American policymaking. This group includes bureaucratic, corporate, intellectual, military, media, and government elites who control the principal institutions in the United States and whose opinions and actions influence the decisions of the policymakers. The basis for membership of a power elite is institutional power, namely an influential position within a prominent private or public organization. A study of the French corporate elite has shown that social class continues to hold sway in determining who joins this elite group, with those from the upper-middle class tending to dominate. Another study (published in 2002) of power elites in the United States during the administration of President George W. Bush (in office 2001-2009) identified 7,314 institutional positions of power encompassing 5,778 individuals. A later study of U.S. society noted demographic characteristics of this elite group as follows: 

 Age  Corporate leaders aged about 60; heads of foundations, law, education, and civic organizations aged around 62; government employees aged about 56.
 Gender  Men contribute roughly 80% in the political realm, whereas women contribute roughly only 20% in the political realm. In the economic denomination, only 32 (6.4%) of the Fortune 500 CEOs are women.
 Ethnicity  In the US, White Anglo-Saxons dominate in the power elite. While Protestants represent about 80% of the top business leaders, about 54% of the members of Congress of any ethnicity are also Protestant. , only 4 (0.8%) of the Fortune 500 CEOs are African American. In similarly low proportions, 10 (2%) of the Fortune 500 CEOs are Latino, and 10 (2%) are Asian.
 Education  Nearly all the leaders have a college education, with almost half graduating with advanced degrees. About 54% of the big-business leaders, and 42% of the government elite graduated from just 12 prestigious universities with large endowments.
 Social clubs  Most holders of top positions in the power elite possess exclusive membership to one or more social clubs. About a third belong to a small number of especially prestigious clubs in major cities like London, New York City, Chicago, Boston, and Washington, D.C.

Impacts on economy

In the 1970s an organized set of policies promoted reduced taxes, especially for the wealthy, and a steady erosion of the welfare safety net. Starting with legislation in the 1980s, the wealthy banking community successfully lobbied for reduced regulation. The wide range of financial and social capital accessible to the power elite gives their members heavy influence in economic and political decision making, allowing them to move toward attaining desired outcomes. Sociologist Christopher Doob gives a hypothetical alternative, stating that these elite individuals would consider themselves the overseers of the national economy. Also appreciating that it is not only a moral, but a practical necessity to focus beyond their group interests. Doing so would hopefully alleviate various destructive conditions affecting large numbers of less affluent citizens.

Global politics and hegemony
Mills determined that there is an "inner core" of the power elite involving individuals that are able to move from one seat of institutional power to another. They, therefore, have a wide range of knowledge and interests in many influential organizations, and are, as Mills describes, "professional go-betweens of economic, political, and military affairs". Relentless expansion of capitalism and the globalizing of economic and military power, binds leaders of the power elite into complex relationships with nation states that generate global-scale class divisions. Sociologist Manuel Castells writes in The Rise of the Network Society that contemporary globalization does not mean that "everything in the global economy is global". So, a global economy becomes characterized by fundamental social inequalities with respect to the "level of integration, competitive potential and share of the benefits from economic growth". Castells cites a kind of "double movement"  where on one hand, "valuable segments of territories and people" become "linked in the global networks of value making and wealth appropriation", while, on the other, "everything and everyone" that is not valued by established networks gets "switched off...and ultimately discarded". These evolutions have also led many social scientists to explore empirically the possible emergence of a new transnational and cohesive social class at the top of the social ladder: a global elite But, the wide-ranging effects of global capitalism ultimately affect everyone on the planet, as economies around the world come to depend on the functioning of global financial markets, technologies, trade and labor.

See also

 Alpha (ethology)
 Boston Brahmin
 Bourgeoisie
 Cabal
 Conflict theories
 Elite theory
 Elitism
 The Establishment
 International Debutante Ball
 Invisible Class Empire
 Jet set
 Liberal elite
 Political class
 The powers that be (phrase)
 Plutocracy

References

Further reading

Heinrich Best, Ronald Gebauer & Axel Salheiser (Eds.): Political and Functional Elites in Post-Socialist Transformation: Central and East Europe since 1989/90. Historical Social Research 37 (2), Special Issue, 2012.
Cousin, Bruno & Sébastien Chauvin (2021). "Is there a global super-bourgeoisie?" Sociology Compass 15 (6): 1–15.
Cousin, Bruno, Shamus Khan & Ashley Mears (2018). "Theoretical and methodological pathways for research on elites" Socio-Economic Review 16 (2): 225-249.
Jan Pakulski, Heinrich Best, Verona Christmas-Best & Ursula Hoffmann-Lange (Eds.): Elite Foundations of Social Theory and Politics. Historical Social Research 37 (1), Special Issue, 2012.

 
 
 
 
 
 
 

Political concepts
Elite theory
Oligarchy
Social status
Majority–minority relations